Walter Welford (May 21, 1868 – June 28, 1952) was inaugurated as the 20th Governor of North Dakota on February 2, 1935 after Thomas H. Moodie was removed from office after it was determined he was ineligible to hold the office. He served until 1937, having lost the 1936 race to former governor William Langer.

Biography
Born in the North Yorkshire village of Bellerby on 21 May 1868, Welford moved with his family to Pembina, North Dakota, in 1879. A farmer, he also served as Vice President of the Merchants Bank of Pembina County. He was married to Edith Bachmann  and they had one child who died in infancy.

Career
Welford served as township clerk at Pembina for twenty years. He also served in the North Dakota House of Representatives (1907 to 1911) and Senate (1917 to 1921). As Lieutenant Governor of North Dakota, Welford became governor after Thomas H. Moodie was disqualified. Welford was a staunch supporter of the Nonpartisan League (NPL), a farmers' political group. During Welford's administration the state was caught in the grip of the Great Depression. The 1936 crop yield was disastrously low because of drought. Welford met with President Franklin Roosevelt and obtained federal aid for drought-stricken farmers. In 1936, Welford decided to run for office again. He beat former Governor William Langer for the Republican gubernatorial nomination, but Langer refused to drop out, and entered the general election as an independent. Welford lost the three-way governor's election to Langer. (The third-place candidate was Democrat John Moses, who became North Dakota's twenty-second governor, following Langer's second term.)

Death
Welford died on June 28, 1952 at the age of 84 en route to a hospital in Altona, Manitoba after being stricken at his home in Pembina County.  He is buried in Cavalier Cemetery, Cavalier, Pembina County, North Dakota US.

See also
List of U.S. state governors born outside the United States

References

External links

National Governors Association

Lieutenant Governors of North Dakota
Republican Party governors of North Dakota
1868 births
1952 deaths
Republican Party members of the North Dakota House of Representatives
Republican Party North Dakota state senators
Nonpartisan League state governors of the United States
20th-century American politicians